Nogometni klub Maribor is a professional association football club from Maribor, Slovenia. Founded in 1960, the club joined the Football Association of Yugoslavia during the same year and was a member thereof until 1991 and the independence of Slovenia when the club joined the Football Association of Slovenia, where it remains to the present day.

Maribor was founded on 12 December 1960 when it entered the Republic League, the third tier of the Yugoslav football system. During its time in the Yugoslav leagues, Maribor was one of only three Slovenian clubs to participate in the Yugoslav First League, the system's top division. In 31 seasons before the independence of Slovenia in 1991, the club played five seasons in the top Yugoslav division, seventeen in the Second League and nine in the Third League (six seasons as part of the Republic League and three in the Inter-Republic League formed at the end of the 1980s). Apart from winning the Yugoslav second division once and the third division five times, the club had no major success during its Yugoslav period; the closest it came to winning a major trophy was in the 1967–68 season, when it reached the semi-finals of the Yugoslav Cup.

Since 1991, Maribor has competed in the Slovenian PrvaLiga, the highest level of football in the country. The team was one of the league's founding members and is one of only two clubs that have competed in every season of the Slovenian top division since its establishment. The first major success for the club was during its first season as part of the Slovenian football system when it won the Slovenian Cup, a feat it has repeated eight times to date for a total of nine cup titles. The club has won the league championship 16 times in 31 seasons and is the most successful club in the country. In 2009 the club also won the Slovenian Supercup for the first time, the last domestic trophy missing among the club's honours.

As of the end of the 2021–22 season, the team have spent 36 seasons in the top division, 17 in the second division and 9 in the third. To date, the club has won a total of 29 domestic trophies. The team plays at the Ljudski vrt stadium since 1961 and played there even during the stadium's construction. This list details the club's achievements in senior league and cup competitions, and the top scorers for each season.

Key

League
P = Matches played
W = Matches won
D = Matches drawn
L = Matches lost
F = Goals for
A = Goals against
Pts = Points won
Pos = Final position

SFR Yugoslavia (1960–61 to 1990–91)
Div 1 = Yugoslav First League
Div 2 = Yugoslav Second League
Div 3 = Yugoslav Third League
Cup = Yugoslav Cup
Slovenia (since 1991–92)
Div 1 = Slovenian PrvaLiga
Cup = Slovenian Cup
Supercup = Slovenian Supercup

Cup / Europe
N/A = Was not held
QR = Qualifying round
R1 = First round
R2 = Second round
R3 = Third round
R16 = Round of 16
R32 = Round of 32
PR = Playoff round
G = Group stage
QF = Quarter-final
SF = Semi-final
F = Final/Runners-up
W = Competition won

Domestic record
Correct as of the end of the 2021–22 season. Top scorer's goal tallies are for league goals only. Due to differences in the competition's structure over time (NK Maribor competed in both the Yugoslav Cup and the Slovenian Cup), performances cannot easily be compared, and are therefore not available for sorting.

|+List of year ranges, representing seasons, and displaying the numbers and types of accomplishments of awards by the team and its players during those timeframes
|-
!scope=row style=text-align:center|1960–61
|bgcolor="#DDFFDD"|Div 3 ↑
|22
|16
|
|
|60
|22
|35
|bgcolor="gold"| 
|
|N/A
|
|
|
|
|-
!scope=row style=text-align:center|1961–62
|Div 2
|22
|10
|
|
|33
|33
|24
|
|R2
|N/A
|
|
|
|
|-
!scope=row style=text-align:center|1962–63
|Div 2
|30
|12
|11
|
|51
|33
|35
|
|R16
|N/A
|
|
|
|17
|-
!scope=row style=text-align:center|1963–64
|Div 2
|30
|17
|
|
|57
|21
|40
|bgcolor="silver"| 
|
|N/A
|
|
|
|14
|-
!scope=row style=text-align:center|1964–65
|Div 2
|30
|16
|
|
|56
|33
|38
|
|
|N/A
|
|
|
|11
|-
!scope=row style=text-align:center|1965–66
|Div 2
|33
|16
|
|
|56
|30
|41
|
|
|N/A
|
|
|
|15
|-
!scope=row style=text-align:center|1966–67
|bgcolor="#ddffdd"|Div 2 ↑
|34
|23
|10
|
|68
|17
|56
|bgcolor="gold"| 
|R16
|N/A
|
|
|  
|11
|-
!scope=row style=text-align:center|1967–68
|Div 1
|30
|
|11
|11
|38
|53
|27
|12th
|SF
|N/A
|
|
|
|11
|-
!scope=row style=text-align:center|1968–69
|Div 1
|34
|
|14
|13
|33
|57
|28
|16th
|
|N/A
|
|
|
|11
|-
!scope=row style=text-align:center|1969–70
|Div 1
|34
|13
|
|14
|40
|51
|33
|10th
|
|N/A
|
|
|
|12
|-
!scope=row style=text-align:center|1970–71
|Div 1
|34
|
|11
|14
|33
|48
|29
|13th
|
|N/A
|Mitropa Cup
|R1
|
|
|-
!scope=row style=text-align:center|1971–72
|style="background:#fcc;"|Div 1 ↓
|34
|
|14
|17
|24
|61
|20
|18th
|
|N/A
|
|
|
|13
|-
!scope=row style=text-align:center|1972–73
|Div 2
|34
|20
|10
|
|69
|23
|50
|bgcolor="silver"| 
|QF
|N/A
|
|
|
|22
|-
!scope=row style=text-align:center|1973–74
|Div 2
|34
|12
|
|14
|46
|42
|32
|13th
|R16
|N/A
|
|
|
|13
|-
!scope=row style=text-align:center|1974–75
|style="background:#fcc;"|Div 2 ↓
|34
|
|15
|10
|37
|46
|33
|15th
|N/A
|N/A
|
|
|
|17
|-
!scope=row style=text-align:center|1975–76
|bgcolor="#ddffdd"|Div 3 ↑
|26
|23
|
|
|86
|21
|47
|bgcolor="gold"| 
|
|N/A
|
|
|  
|
|-
!scope=row style=text-align:center|1976–77
|Div 2
|34
|14
|
|13
|44
|49
|35
|
|
|N/A
|
|
|
|17
|-
!scope=row style=text-align:center|1977–78
|Div 2
|34
|13
|12
|
|47
|39
|38
|
|R32
|N/A
|
|
|
|
|-
!scope=row style=text-align:center|1978–79
|Div 2
|30
|12
|10
|
|46
|34
|34
|bgcolor="silver"| 
|
|N/A
|
|
|
|
|-
!scope=row style=text-align:center|1979–80
|Div 2
|30
|13
|
|12
|47
|38
|31
|
|QF
|N/A
|
|
|
|19
|-
!scope=row style=text-align:center|1980–81
|style="background:#fcc;"|Div 2 ↓
|30
|14
|
|
|50
|48
|36
|10th
|
|N/A
|
|
|
|19
|-
!scope=row style=text-align:center|1981–82
|bgcolor="#ddffdd"|Div 3 ↑
|26
|18
|
|
|52
|13
|42
|bgcolor="gold"| 
|R16
|N/A
|
|
|
|10
|-
!scope=row style=text-align:center|1982–83
|style="background:#fcc;"|Div 2 ↓
|34
|
|12
|15
|24
|40
|26
|17th
|
|N/A
|
|
|  
|
|-
!scope=row style=text-align:center|1983–84
|bgcolor="#ddffdd"|Div 3 ↑
|26
|22
|
|
|74
|11
|35
|bgcolor="gold"| 
|R32
|N/A
|
|
|
|20
|-
!scope=row style=text-align:center|1984–85
|style="background:#fcc;"|Div 2 ↓
|34
|11
|
|17
|39
|47
|28
|16th
|
|N/A
|
|
|
|10
|-
!scope=row style=text-align:center|1985–86
|bgcolor="#ddffdd"|Div 3 ↑
|26
|17
|
|
|66
|18
|40
|bgcolor="gold"| 
|R16
|N/A
|
|
|
|30
|-
!scope=row style=text-align:center|1986–87
|style="background:#fcc;"|Div 2 ↓
|34
|11
|
|17
|36
|59
|28
|16th
|R16
|N/A
|
|
|
|15
|-
!scope=row style=text-align:center|1987–88
|Div 3
|26
|16
|
|
|40
|17
|38
|bgcolor="silver"| 
|
|N/A
|
|
|
|
|-
!scope=row style=text-align:center|1988–89
|Div 3
|34
|12
|
|13
|30
|32
|30
|10th
|R32
|N/A
|
|
|
|
|-
!scope=row style=text-align:center|1989–90
|Div 3
|34
|12
|
|15
|38
|36
|29
|11th
|R32
|N/A
|
|
|
|11
|-
!scope=row style=text-align:center|1990–91
|Div 3
|34
|14
|
|15
|34
|37
|31
|
|
|N/A
|
|
|
|10
|-
!scope=row style=text-align:center|1991–92
|Div 1
|40
|25
|
|
|76
|29
|59
|bgcolor="silver"| 
|bgcolor="gold"|W 
|N/A
|
|
|
|27
|-
!scope=row style=text-align:center|1992–93
|Div 1
|34
|18
|12
|
|50
|20
|48
|bgcolor="silver"| 
|R16
|N/A
|UEFA Cup Winners' Cup
|R1
|  
|12
|-
!scope=row style=text-align:center|1993–94
|Div 1
|30
|16
|10
|
|55
|24
|42
|
|bgcolor="gold"|W 
|N/A
|UEFA Cup
|R2
|
|13
|-
!scope=row style=text-align:center|1994–95
|Div 1
|30
|17
|
|
|61
|23
|42
|bgcolor="silver"| 
|SF
|N/A
|UEFA Cup Winners' Cup
|R1
|
|
|-
!scope=row style=text-align:center|1995–96
|Div 1
|36
|14
|11
|11
|47
|32
|53
|
|R16
|
|UEFA Cup
|R1
|   
|
|-
!scope=row style=text-align:center|1996–97
|Div 1
|36
|21
|
|
|71
|34
|71
|bgcolor="gold"| 
|bgcolor="gold"|W 
|
|UEFA Intertoto Cup
|G
|
|14
|-
!scope=row style=text-align:center|1997–98
|Div 1
|36
|24
|
|
|69
|34
|76
|bgcolor="gold"| 
|QF
|N/A
|UEFA Champions LeagueUEFA Cup 
|QRR1
|
|10
|-
!scope=row style=text-align:center|1998–99
|Div 1
|33
|19
|
|
|72
|29
|66
|bgcolor="gold"| 
|bgcolor="gold"|W 
|N/A
|UEFA Champions LeagueUEFA Cup
|QRR1
|
|15
|-
!scope=row style=text-align:center|1999–2000
|Div 1
|33
|25
|
|
|90
|30
|81
|bgcolor="gold"| 
|SF
|N/A
|UEFA Champions League
|G
|
|bgcolor="#FFFF00"|24 ♦
|-
!scope=row style=text-align:center|2000–01
|Div 1
|33
|18
|
|
|61
|36
|62
|bgcolor="gold"| 
|QF
|N/A
|UEFA Champions League
|QR
|
|
|-
!scope=row style=text-align:center|2001–02
|Div 1
|33
|19
|
|
|64
|23
|66
|bgcolor="gold"| 
|SF
|N/A
|UEFA Champions League
|QR
|
|15
|-
!scope=row style=text-align:center|2002–03
|Div 1
|31
|18
|
|
|56
|31
|62
|bgcolor="gold"| 
|QF
|N/A
|UEFA Champions League
|QR
|
|13
|-
!scope=row style=text-align:center|2003–04
|Div 1
|32
|15
|
|
|51
|34
|54
|
|bgcolor="gold"|W 
|N/A
|UEFA Champions League
|QR
|
|12
|-
!scope=row style=text-align:center|2004–05
|Div 1
|32
|15
|
|11
|47
|36
|51
|
|SF
|N/A
|UEFA Cup
|R1
|
|bgcolor="#FFFF00"|18 ♦
|-
!scope=row style=text-align:center|2005–06
|Div 1
|36
|16
|
|14
|51
|42
|54
|
|SF
|N/A
|
|
|
|
|-
!scope=row style=text-align:center|2006–07
|Div 1
|36
|15
|12
|
|64
|50
|57
|
|bgcolor="silver"|F 
|N/A
|UEFA Intertoto CupUEFA Cup
|R3QR
|
|13
|-
!scope=row style=text-align:center|2007–08
|Div 1
|36
|14
|10
|12
|55
|46
|52
|
|bgcolor="silver"|F 
|
|UEFA Intertoto Cup
|R2
|
|10
|-
|-
!scope=row style=text-align:center|2008–09
|Div 1
|36
|17
|12
|
|62
|44
|63
|bgcolor="gold"| 
|SF
|
|
|
|
|15
|-
!scope=row style=text-align:center|2009–10
|Div 1
|36
|18
|
|10
|58
|44
|63
|bgcolor="silver"| 
|bgcolor="gold"|W 
|bgcolor="gold"|W  
|UEFA Champions LeagueUEFA Europa League
|QRPR 
|
|15
|-
!scope=row style=text-align:center|2010–11
|Div 1
|36
|21
|12
|
|65
|25
|75
|bgcolor="gold"| 
|bgcolor="silver"|F 
|bgcolor="silver"|F  
|UEFA Europa League
|PR
|
|bgcolor="#FFFF00"|16 ♦
|-
!scope=row style=text-align:center|2011–12
|Div 1
|36
|26
|
|
|88
|35
|85
|bgcolor="gold"| 
|bgcolor="gold"|W 
|bgcolor="silver"|F  
|UEFA Champions LeagueUEFA Europa League
|QRG
|
|17 
|-
!scope=row style=text-align:center|2012–13
|Div 1
|36
|24
|
|
|80
|35
|78
|bgcolor="gold"| 
|bgcolor="gold"|W 
|bgcolor="gold"|W  
|UEFA Champions LeagueUEFA Europa League
|PRG
|
|bgcolor="#FFFF00"|17 ♦
|-
!scope=row style=text-align:center|2013–14
|Div 1
|36
|24
|
|
|78
|31
|77
|bgcolor="gold"| 
|bgcolor="silver"|F 
|bgcolor="gold"|W  
|UEFA Champions LeagueUEFA Europa League
|PRR32
|
|16 
|-
!scope=row style=text-align:center|2014–15
|Div 1
|36
|24
|
|
|74
|32
|79
|bgcolor="gold"| 
|SF
|bgcolor="gold"|W  
|UEFA Champions League
|G
|
|bgcolor="#FFFF00"|17 ♦
|-
!scope=row style=text-align:center|2015–16
|Div 1
|36
|19
|11
|
|78
|37
|68
|bgcolor="silver"| 
|bgcolor="gold"|W  
|bgcolor="silver"|F 
|UEFA Champions League
|QR
|
|bgcolor="#FFFF00"|17 ♦
|-
!scope=row style=text-align:center|2016–17
|Div 1
|36
|21
|10
|
|63
|30
|73
|bgcolor="gold"| 
|SF
|N/A
|UEFA Europa League
|PR
|
|15
|-
!scope=row style=text-align:center|2017–18
|Div 1
|36
|24
|
|
|76
|28
|80
|bgcolor="silver"| 
|QF
|N/A
|UEFA Champions League
|G
|
|bgcolor="#FFFF00"|18 ♦
|-
!scope=row style=text-align:center|2018–19
|Div 1
|36
|23
|
|
|82
|34
|78
|bgcolor="gold"| 
|bgcolor="silver"|F 
|N/A
|UEFA Europa League
|QR
|
|bgcolor="#FFFF00"|18 ♦
|-
!scope=row style=text-align:center|2019–20
|Div 1
|36
|20
|7
|
|66
|39
|67
|bgcolor="silver"| 
|R16
|N/A
|UEFA Champions LeagueUEFA Europa League
|QRPR
|
|14
|-
!scope=row style=text-align:center|2020–21
|Div 1
|36
|17
|12
|
|64
|41
|63
|bgcolor="silver"| 
|QF
|N/A
|UEFA Europa League
|QR
|
|bgcolor="#FFFF00"|14 ♦
|-
!scope=row style=text-align:center|2021–22
|Div 1
|36
|21
|
|
|57
|37
|70
|bgcolor="gold"| 
|QF
|N/A
|UEFA Europa Conference League
|QR
|
|bgcolor="#FFFF00"|17 ♦
|-
|}

Footnotes
The Slovenian Republic League, the highest football league in SR Slovenia, was regarded as the third level league within the Yugoslav football system for most of the time. In 1988 Football Association of Yugoslavia reorganized its competitions and replaced the Republic leagues with the newly formed Inter-Republic league which effectively became the third tier of Yugoslav football.
The 1974–75 Yugoslav Cup edition was not held, due to the rescheduling purposes as the Football Association of Yugoslavia had decided to move the date of cup final from 29 November (or Republic Day, the anniversary of the establishment of communist Yugoslavia) to on or around 25 May (or Youth Day, a national holiday which doubled as the official celebration of Josip Broz Tito's birthday). As a direct consequence, the 1975–76 Cup edition was contested for almost two years.
The club was relegated after a verdict by the Disciplinary Committee of the Football Association of Yugoslavia due to the "Ball" bribery scandal.
After Slovenia's independence in 1991, Maribor joined the Football Association of Slovenia, the governing body of Slovenian football. The team was one of the founding members of the Slovenian PrvaLiga and played there ever since.
As of 2022, Maribor is the only Slovenian club to have appeared in the group stages of the UEFA Champions League.
UEFA acknowledges Maribor as one of the winners of the 2006 UEFA Intertoto Cup, however, the trophy itself was awarded to Newcastle United, the team that advanced farthest in UEFA competitions that season.
As of 2022, Maribor is the only Slovenian club to have appeared in the group stages of the UEFA Europa League.

References
General

Specific

External links
Official website 
Official supporters' website 

Seasons
 
Maribor